Giacomo, or Jacob de Decker (1640, Haarlem – 1680, Rome), was a Dutch Golden Age painter.

Biography
According to Houbraken he travelled to Rome and joined the bentvueghels with the bentname Gulden Regen. He signed Abraham Genoels bentbrief on 3 January 1675.

According to the RKD he may have been the son of the Haarlem landscape painter Cornelis Gerritsz Decker. He is known in Haarlem for his illustrations for Petrus Scriverius.

References

Jacob de Decker on Artnet

1640 births
1680 deaths
Dutch Golden Age painters
Dutch male painters
Artists from Haarlem
Members of the Bentvueghels